Ollie Byrd (1896 – May 7, 1929) was an American Negro league first baseman in the 1920s.

A native of Mississippi, Byrd played for the Chicago Giants in 1921. In 29 recorded games, he posted 21 hits in 95 plate appearances. Byrd died in Chicago, Illinois in 1929 at age 33.

References

External links
 and Seamheads

1896 births
1929 deaths
Date of birth missing
Place of birth missing
Chicago Giants players
Baseball first basemen
Baseball players from Mississippi
20th-century African-American sportspeople